Piazza al Serchio is a comune (municipality) in the Province of Lucca in the Italian region Tuscany, located about  northwest of Florence and about  northwest of Lucca.

Piazza al Serchio borders the following municipalities: Camporgiano, Minucciano, San Romano in Garfagnana, Sillano Giuncugnano.

The Romanesque stone church of Santa Maria Assunta is located in the frazione of Borsigliana.

References

Cities and towns in Tuscany